The Bezdna or Pasna is a river in Chuvashia, Russian Federation, a right-bank tributary of the Sura.

Major tributaries are Abamza, Orbezdna, Black Bezdna. The maximal mineralization 500-700 mg/L. Average sediment in mouth per year is 71 mm. Drainage is regulated. In the upper stream use to dry.

References 

Rivers of Chuvashia